Kauppakeskus Valkea is a shopping mall in Oulu, Finland. The mall includes about 60 shops, department store Sokos and 66 apartments. It's Osuuskauppa Arina's biggest investment so far, about 100 million euros. The estimated amount of new jobs it offers is about 400. The building is currently the tallest apartment building in downtown Oulu.

The mall was opened on 14 April 2016. The opening weekend gathered over 80 000 people to the mall. The opening day itself attracted over 23 000 shoppers.

Stores

International chains
Bik Bok
Carlings
Clas Ohlson
Cubus
Dinsko
Gina Tricot
Glitter
Granit
Volt
Indiska
Polarn O. Pyret 
Telia
The Body Shop
Flying Tiger Copenhagen

Finnish shops/chains
Elisa
Fonum
Gazoz
Instrumentarium
Jasmin
Karkkipäivä
Kultajousi Elegance
Natural
Mick's
Noomi
Rags
Seppälä
Silmäasema
Sokos
Sokos Herkku Kiosk
Suomalainen Kirjakauppa
Ombrellino
Kairahouse

Restaurants and cafés
Arnold's
Bacaro Doppio
Classic Pizza
Friends & Brgrs
Hanko Sushi
Jungle Juice Bar
Chinese restaurant Kirin
La Torrefazione
Picnic
Pizzarium
Rosso
Sokos Herkku Restaurant
Spice Ice
Wok's

Other services
S-Bank 
Original Sokos Hotel Arina conference rooms
Posti SmartPOST unit

See also
 Zeppelin (shopping centre)

References

Shopping centres in Oulu
Pokkinen
Valkea